OMV World Rally Team was a name used by several different World Rally Championship teams and entrants in the 2000s: the Kronos Racing (2005, 2007); and Bozian Racing (2006). The name was derived from commercial sponsorship arrangements, with financial support of OMV company. Mostly in support for Manfred Stohl.

WRC Results

PWRC results

JWRC results

World Rally Championship teams
World Rally Championship